Cryptodactylus is a genus of beetles in the family Buprestidae, containing the following species:

 Cryptodactylus aeneiventris Bourgoin, 1922
 Cryptodactylus albofasciatus Fisher, 1935
 Cryptodactylus binhensis Descarpentries & Villiers, 1966
 Cryptodactylus coeruleus Saunders, 1866
 Cryptodactylus coomani Descarpentries & Villiers, 1966
 Cryptodactylus cuprascens Kerremans, 1892
 Cryptodactylus cyaneoniger Kerremans, 1892
 Cryptodactylus fasciatus Baudon, 1968
 Cryptodactylus francoisi Baudon, 1968
 Cryptodactylus kerremansi Descarpentries & Villiers, 1966
 Cryptodactylus laosensis Baudon, 1961
 Cryptodactylus lugubris Deyrolle, 1864
 Cryptodactylus philippinensis Saunders, 1874
 Cryptodactylus planicollis Descarpentries & Villiers, 1966
 Cryptodactylus rondoni Baudon, 1968
 Cryptodactylus scutellaris Kerremans, 1892
 Cryptodactylus thomasi Baudon, 1965
 Cryptodactylus tonkinensis Descarpentries & Villiers, 1966
 Cryptodactylus tristis Deyrolle, 1864
 Cryptodactylus vitalisi Descarpentries & Villiers, 1966
 Cryptodactylus weyersi Kerremans, 1903

References

Buprestidae genera